The Catskills by Asher Brown Durand, an American engraver, portraitist, and landscape artist, was commissioned by William Thompson Walters in 1858.

History
Asher Brown Durand, known for his skill as an engraver and portraitist, left this career path in 1837 to pursue landscape painting.  He was persuaded by his friend and fellow artist, Thomas Cole, who lived in the Catskill region.  Durand, who resided in New York, corresponded with Cole and wrote in one of his letters, "now, if there be a man on earth whose location I envy... it is Thomas Cole".  During the summer months Durand would often go on expeditions in search of beauty and the Catskills were one of the areas he often explored.

The Catskills, completed in 1859, reflects the Transcendental philosophy of Ralph Waldo Emerson. This style was consistent with the Hudson River School, to which Durand was a founding member. It is also noted that after Durand's return from Europe in 1841, his landscapes reflect influence by the European painters Claude Lorrain and John Constable.

Composition
In the foreground two large trees are presented, one a black birch and the other a sycamore.  A stream falls over a cliff and then winds through the valley toward the sunny area in the distance.  A squirrel crouching on a rock is the only sign of animate life, representing the loneliness of the scene.

Off the Wall
Currently, The Catskills, is being featured in Off the Wall, an open-air exhibition on the streets of Baltimore, Maryland. A reproduction of the painting, the original is part of The Walters Art Museum collection, will be on display at Meadowood Regional Park. The National Gallery in London began the concept of bringing art out of doors in 2007 and the Detroit Institute of Art introduced the concept in the United States. The Off the Wall reproductions of the Walters' paintings are done on weather-resistant vinyl and include a description of the painting and a QR code for smartphones.

Exhibition History
Romanticism in America. Baltimore Museum of Art, Baltimore. 1940.
Highlights from the Collection. The Walters Art Gallery, Baltimore. 1998-2001.
The American Artist as Painter and Draftsman. The Walters Art Museum, Baltimore. 2001.
Kindred Spirits: Asher B. Durand and the American Landscape. Brooklyn Museum, Brooklyn; Smithsonian American Art Museum, Washington; San Diego Museum Of Art, San Diego. 2007-2008.
19th Century Masterpieces from the Walters Art Museum. Santa Barbara Museum of Art, Santa Barbara; Jack S. Blanton Museum of Art, Austin. 2010-2011.

References

External links
American paradise: the world of the Hudson River school, an exhibition catalog from The Metropolitan Museum of Art (fully available online as PDF), which contains material on The Catskills (see index)

19th-century paintings
1859 paintings
American paintings
Paintings in the collection of the Walters Art Museum
Catskills
Hudson River School paintings